The Musée – Librairie du Compagnonnage is a museum devoted to French trade guilds. It is located in the 6th arrondissement at 10, rue Mabillon, Paris, France, and open weekday afternoons; entry is free.

The museum is operated by the Compagnons du Tour de France in the former seat of the Compagnons Charpentiers du Devoir de Liberté ("Indiens"), and documents the history of French trade guilds from their medieval origins to the present day. It contains artifacts, tools, photographs, and documents pertaining to these diverse associations of skilled craftsmen in fields such as cooking, pastry, plumbing, ironworks, masonry, cabinetmaking, carpentry, etc. Since medieval times, these craftsmen have made a Tour de France as they acquire their knowledge from masters (maîtres) and progress from apprenti to compagnon and perhaps ultimately to maître. To become a master of the Compagnons du Devoir (founded 1347), each must create a masterpiece (chef d'œuvre) which is then judged by a college of masters; the museum contains some of these impressive pieces.

See also 
 List of museums in Paris

References

External links 

 Musée - Librairie du Compagnonnage
 Paris.org entry
 ParisInfo entry
 UnderstandFrance.org description

Museums in Paris
Buildings and structures in the 6th arrondissement of Paris
History museums in France
Industry museums in France